Terri Harper (born 2 November 1996) is a British professional boxer and current WBA and IBO Super-Welterweight champion. She is also the former super-featherweight world champion, having held the IBO female title from 2019 to November 2021 and the WBC version from 2020 to November 2021. Following a brief amateur career, Harper made her professional debut in 2017. She won her first championship two years later, capturing the regional WBC International female lightweight title in 2019. Later that year she moved down a weight class to the super-featherweight division to win her first world championship, the vacant IBO title, and added the WBC title to her collection the following year after defeating long-reigning champion Eva Wahlström. With her victory over Wahlström, Harper became the second British woman after Nicola Adams to hold a major world championship. 

As of October 2021, Harper is ranked as the world's second best active female super-featherweight by The Ring and fourth by BoxRec.

Early life
Born on 2 November 1996 in Denaby Main, Harper was raised in Yorkshire with her two brothers and sister. She got into boxing at the age of 12 after watching Jack Osbourne box on the TV show Jack Osbourne: Adrenaline Junkie. After winning a silver medal as an amateur at the 2012 European Junior Championships, Harper stepped away from the sport to concentrate on her education. She returned to amateur boxing after completing her GCSEs, only to become disillusioned with the sport after losing her first two bouts. While deciding whether or not to continue with boxing, Harper received a call from a boxing promoter with an offer to turn over to the professional side of the sport. She subsequently accepted the offer, and stated that she has "never looked back since".

Amateur career
As an amateur, Harper only competed 17 times, which saw her win three national titles and a silver medal at the European Junior Championships in Poland.

Professional career

Early years 
Harper made her professional debut on 25 November 2017, at the Doncaster Dome in Doncaster, scoring a four-round points decision (PTS) victory over Monika Antonik.

After four more fights in 2018—PTS wins over Borislava Goranova in February and Bojana Libiszewska in April, and stoppage wins over Bec Connolly in October and Feriche Mashauri in December—she faced undefeated Commonwealth super-lightweight champion Nina Bradley on 8 March 2019, at the Barnsley Metrodome in Barnsley, with the vacant WBC International female lightweight title on the line. In a fight which saw Bradley down twice in the first two rounds, Harper won via technical knockout (TKO) in the tenth and final round. At the time of the stoppage all three judges had Harper winning on the scorecards with 90–79, 89–80, and 89–80.

IBO super-featherweight champion

Harper vs. Bell, Obenauf 
Following a stoppage win against Claudia Lopez in May, Harper faced former world title challenger Nozipho Bell on 19 July for the vacant IBO female super-featherweight title at the Magna Centre in Rotherham. Harper dropped her opponent twice in the eighth round before referee Howard Foster called a halt to the contest, handing Harper her first world title via eighth-round TKO.

It was announced in September 2019 that Harper had signed a promotional contract with Eddie Hearn's Matchroom Boxing, with her first fight under the new promotion to take place on 2 November against former two-time world title challenger Viviane Obenauf at the Manchester Arena. The fight was televised live on Sky Sports as part of the undercard of Katie Taylor's world title bout against Christina Linardatou. Harper successfully retained her IBO title via unanimous decision (UD) over ten rounds, with the judges' scorecards reading 99–91, 99–92, and 97–93. In the post-fight interview, Hearn announced that terms had been agreed for Harper to challenge reigning champion Eva Wahlström for the WBC female super-featherweight title in early 2020.

WBC and IBO super-featherweight champion

Harper vs. Wahlström 
On 20 December it was announced that Harper would challenge Wahlström on 8 February 2020, at the FlyDSA Arena (formerly Sheffield Arena), with Harper's IBO and Wahlström's WBC titles on the line. The fight was aired live on Sky Sports in the UK and DAZN in the US as part of the undercard for Kell Brook vs. Mark DeLuca. Harper knocked Wahlström down in round seven en-route to a UD victory, adding the WBC to her IBO title to become the second British female boxer, after Nicola Adams, to capture a major world title. Two judges scored the bout 99–90 and the third judge scored it 98–91.

Harper vs. Jonas 
She defended her titles against former Olympian Natasha Jonas on 7 August 2020, at the Matchroom Sport headquarters in Brentwood, Essex. After a closely contested fight which saw Jonas suffer a cut above her right eye in the early rounds before staggering Harper in the eighth, the result went to the judges' scorecards; one judge scored the bout 96–94 in favour of Harper, the second judge scored it 96–95 to Jonas, while the third judge scored it even at 95–95, resulting in a split draw to see Harper retain her titles. The bout was the first time two British women contested a world title.

Harper vs. Thanderz 
In the second defence of her WBC title and fourth of her IBO, Harper faced former European female super-featherweight champion Katharina Thanderz on 14 November 2020. The bout served as part of the undercard for Katie Taylor's world title defence against Miriam Gutiérrez at The SSE Arena in London. Thanderz suffered an injury to her nose after an accidental clash of heads in the ninth round before being hurt with a punch to the body, causing her to bend over in pain. Harper followed up with a sustained assault, landing combinations to the head and body, prompting referee Victor Loughlin to call a halt to the contest to award Harper a ninth-round TKO victory.

Harper vs. Choi 
In April 2021, it was announced that Harper would face WBA female super-featherweight champion Hyun Mi Choi on 15 May, at the AO Arena (formerly known as Manchester Arena). The bout was to be televised live on Sky Sports in the UK and streamed live on DAZN in the US and more than 200 countries and territories. In early May, Harper was forced to withdraw from the bout after suffering a hand injury during sparring.

Personal life
Harper came out as gay to her father and step mother at the age of 14.

Professional boxing record

References

External links

Living people
1996 births
Sportspeople from Yorkshire
English women boxers
Lightweight boxers
International Boxing Organization champions
World Boxing Council champions
World super-featherweight boxing champions